This is a list of managers in the TT Pro League, which began league play in 1999. The list includes individuals who have managed a club while they were in the TT Pro League. The Pro League represents the highest division in the Trinidad and Tobago football league pyramid and consists of nine professional football clubs.

There have been eight managers that have won the Pro League. In addition, four foreign managers have secured the Pro League championship, which comprise two English (Terry Fenwick, San Juan Jabloteh, three wins) and (Ricky Hill, San Juan Jabloteh, one win), a Guyanese (James McLean, North East Stars, one win), and a Saint Lucian (Stuart Charles-Fevrier, W Connection, five wins). Michael McComie became the second Trinidad and Tobago manager to win the league, when he won the title with Joe Public in 2006. Derek King later became the third Trinidad and Tobago manager to claim the league title in 2009, also with Joe Public. In fact, King became the youngest manager to win the league title at 29 years, 198 days.

Only Ronald La Forest has managed three different Pro League teams including San Juan Jabloteh, Joe Public, and Ma Pau. Eight managers have managed two different clubs in the Pro League. Jamaal Shabazz managed briefly at Joe Public before moving to Morvant Caledonia United. Michael McComie has managed Joe Public and Ma Pau. Michael Maurice previously managed South Starworld Strikers before becoming manager of Police in 2007. Peter Granville managed Doc's Khelwalaas before guiding Tobago United during the club's entire eight year history. Angus Eve served as caretaker manager to San Juan Jabloteh before arriving at Sangre Grande with North East Stars in 2012–13. Everald Cummings was the manager of South Starworld Strikers before moving to North East Stars. Terry Fenwick managed San Juan Jabloteh on three separate occasions before accepting the position at Central FC.

Stuart Charles-Fevrier has the longest active tenure as manager in the Pro League having been W Connection's manager since June 2004. Ross Russell of Defence Force has the second longest tenure after becoming the Teteron Boys' manager on 8 April 2009. However, Jamaal Shabazz holds the record for longest tenure in the Pro League having served as the manager of Morvant Caledonia United for 12 years and 236 days before departing to become co-manager of the Trinidad and Tobago national team.

Managers
Managers are listed from their appointment to their respective Pro League club, whether in a permanent or temporary role. Some of these managers were appointed as caretaker managers prior to being given a permanent position. However, caretaker managers are listed only when they have managed the team for at least one match in that period. In addition, the dates of appointment and departure of managers may fall outside the club's period in the TT Pro League.

References

External links
Official Website
Soca Warriors Online, TT Pro League

managers